Now or Never is a 1935 American crime film directed by Bernard B. Ray and starring Richard Talmadge, Janet Chandler and Eddie Davis.

Plot

Cast
 Richard Talmadge as Dick Rainey / Norman Gray 
 Janet Chandler as Audrey Ferry 
 Eddie Davis as Riley 
 Robert Walker as Mike McGowan - Henchman 
 Otto Metzetti as Henchman Braun 
 Tom Ricketts as Robert - the Butler
 Victor Metzetti as Cobb - Henchman

References

Bibliography
 Balio, Tino. Grand Design: Hollywood as a Modern Business Enterprise, 1930–1939. University of California Press.

External links
 

1935 films
1930s crime action films
American crime action films
Films directed by Bernard B. Ray
Reliable Pictures films
American black-and-white films
1930s English-language films
1930s American films